Michael Chrastecky (born 19 July 1999) is a Czech-born Slovenian-Italian ice dancer. With his skating partner, Carolina Portesi Peroni, he is the 2023 Italian national bronze medalist, a two-time Italian junior national champion (2020–21) and competed in the final segment at the 2020 World Junior Championships.

Competing for Slovenia with his former skating partner, Mina Švajger, he is the 2016 Slovenian junior national champion.

Personal life 
Chrastecky was born on 19 July 1999 in Karlovy Vary, Czech Republic. His family relocated to Slovenia when he was young. Chrastecky became an Italian citizen in September 2021.

Career

Early career 
Chrastecky initially competed as a singles skater representing Slovenia, winning the national novice title twice. He later switched to ice dance and partnered with Mina Švajger. Švajger/Chrastecky debuted on the Junior Grand Prix in the 2015–16 season, placing twentieth at the 2015 JGP Austria and sixteenth at the 2015 JGP Croatia. The team split after one season.

Chrastecky next formed a partnership with Carolina Portesi Peroni representing Italy. Portesi Peroni/Chrastecky made their Junior Grand Prix debut at the 2017 JGP Italy, where they placed tenth. They did not return to the Junior Grand Prix the following season, competing instead at several minor, junior internationals and winning the bronze medal at the Italian championships.

2019–20 season 
Returning to the Junior Grand Prix, Portesi Peroni/Chrastecky placed seventh at 2019 JGP France and ninth at 2019 JGP Croatia. They won a bronze medal at the junior competition at Golden Spin and then took the gold at the Italian junior nationals for the first time.  They concluded the season making their debut at the World Junior Championships, where they finished in seventeenth position.

2020–21 season 
With the coronavirus pandemic causing the cancellation of the international junior season, Portesi Peroni/Chrastecky won their second consecutive Italian junior title.

2021–22 season 
Making their international senior debut on the Challenger series, Portesi Peroni/Chrastecky placed eleventh on the 2021 CS Lombardia Trophy.  They next competed at the 2021 CS Nebelhorn Trophy, seeking to qualify a second spot for Italy at the 2022 Winter Olympics. They placed eighth, making Italy the third reserve.

Programs

With Portesi Peroni

With Švajger

Competitive highlights 
GP: Grand Prix; CS: Challenger Series; JGP: Junior Grand Prix

With Portesi Peroni for Italy

With Švajger for Slovenia

Men's singles for Slovenia

Detailed results 
ISU Personal best highlighted in bold.

 With Portesi Peroni

Senior-level results

Junior-level results

References

External links 
 
 
 

1999 births
Living people
Italian male ice dancers
Slovenian male single skaters
Sportspeople from Karlovy Vary
Naturalised citizens of Italy